Couternon is a commune in the Côte-d'Or department in eastern France.

Population

Notable people
 Jocelyne Pérard (b. 1940), geographer; president, University of Burgundy, 1993-98

See also
Communes of the Côte-d'Or department

References

Communes of Côte-d'Or